Kim Cheol-gyu (Kim Chul-kyu, born 20 August 1938) is a South Korean equestrian. He competed in two events at the 1964 Summer Olympics.

References

External links
 

1938 births
Living people
South Korean male equestrians
Olympic equestrians of South Korea
Equestrians at the 1964 Summer Olympics
Place of birth missing (living people)